The Apostolic Nunciature to Cyprus is an ecclesiastical office of the Catholic Church in Cyprus. It is a diplomatic post of the Holy See, whose representative is called the Apostolic Nuncio with the rank of an ambassador.

List of papal representatives
Apostolic Pro-Nuncios 
Pio Laghi (28 May 1973 – 27 April 1974)
William Aquin Carew (13 May 1974 – 30 August 1983)
Carlo Curis (4 February 1984 – 28 March 1990)
Andrea Cordero Lanza di Montezemolo (28 May 1990 – 7 March 1998)
Apostolic Nuncios
Pietro Sambi (6 June 1998 – 17 December 2005) 
Antonio Franco (21 January 2006 – 18 August 2012)
Giuseppe Lazzarotto (30 August 2012 – 28 August 2017)
Leopoldo Girelli (15 September 2017 – 13 March 2021)
 Adolfo Tito Yllana (3 June 2021 – 17 February 2023)
 Giovanni Pietro Dal Toso (17 February 2023 – present)

References

 
Cyprus
Holy See
Cyprus–Holy See relations